Bourbon Street Secrets is a mixtape by American rapper Curren$y and producer Purps. It was released for online download on April 20, 2016.

Track listing
All tracks are produced by Purps.

References

2016 mixtape albums
Currensy albums